Hu Yingzhen (born December 9, 1984 in Taipei), also known by the stage name Xiao Zhen and the English name Karen Hu, is a Taiwanese actress, model, and host. Her father, Hu Gua, is also a famous host in Taiwan. She is known for her roles in Lucky Days, Boysitter, and The Fierce Wife.

Personal life
She attended high school in Switzerland for four years. In 2007, she married plastic surgeon Li Jinliang. However, after multiple extramarital affairs, she filed divorce papers in 2013. They have a daughter.

Filmography

Film

Television

References

1984 births
Living people
Actresses from Taipei